Ashburton Aerodrome  is a small airport  to the east of Ashburton township on the east coast of the South Island, New Zealand.
Newmans Air operated a Christchurch to Queenstown service via Ashburton in the 1980s which allowed skiers to connect to the nearby skifield of Mt. Hutt. Currently there are no scheduled services operating to Ashburton.

Operational information
Pilot Controlled Lighting Runway 16/34 
Circuit: All runways left hand 
Circuit Height: 1300 ft AMSL

Sources 
NZAIP Volume 4 AD
AIP New Zealand (PDF)

See also

 List of airports in New Zealand
 List of airlines of New Zealand
 Transport in New Zealand

External links
Ashburton Aerodrome Official site
Ashburton Aviation Museum

Airports in New Zealand
Transport buildings and structures in Canterbury, New Zealand
Ashburton, New Zealand